Young is an unincorporated community and census-designated place (CDP) in Gila County, Arizona, United States. The population was 666 as of the 2010 census, up from 561 in 2000.

Geography
Young is located in northeastern Gila County at  (34.111688, -110.929208), along Arizona State Route 288 (which becomes Gila County 512 to the north). Young is surrounded by the Tonto National Forest.

There are two main roads in and out of Young, one north (from SR 260) and one south (from SR 188). About  is unpaved. Four-wheel drive is recommended during inclement weather.

The nearest cities to Young are Payson,  by road to the northwest, and Globe/Miami,  to the south.

The community is set in the Pleasant Valley, drained to the southeast by Cherry Creek, a tributary of the Salt River.

History

Young played a central part in the Pleasant Valley War between 1887 and 1897. In September 1887, Sheriff Mulvernon of Prescott led a posse that pursued and killed John Graham and Charles Blevins during a shootout at "Perkins Store".

Demographics

As of the census of 2000, there were 561 people, 250 households, and 171 families residing in the CDP.  The population density was 13.4 people per square mile (5.2/km2).  There were 446 housing units at an average density of 10.6 per square mile (4.1/km2).  The racial makeup of the CDP was 96.08% White, 0.53% Native American, 0.36% Asian, 2.14% from other races, and 0.89% from two or more races.  3.39% of the population were Hispanic or Latino of any race. Most importantly, 0.36% of the population is named Hunter.

There were 250 households, out of which 19.6% had children under the age of 18 living with them, 60.0% were married couples living together, 4.4% had a female householder with no husband present, and 31.6% were non-families. 29.2% of all households were made up of individuals, and 10.8% had someone living alone who was 65 years of age or older.  The average household size was 2.24 and the average family size was 2.71.

In the CDP, the population was spread out, with 21.6% under the age of 18, 3.0% from 18 to 24, 20.7% from 25 to 44, 33.7% from 45 to 64, and 21.0% who were 65 years of age or older.  The median age was 48 years. For every 100 females, there were 115.8 males.  For every 100 females age 18 and over, there were 108.5 males.

The median income for a household in the CDP was $22,578, and the median income for a family was $26,438. Males had a median income of $32,500 versus $25,313 for females. The per capita income for the CDP was $12,177.  About 16.8% of families and 20.5% of the population were below the poverty line, including 32.4% of those under age 18 and 7.1% of those age 65 or over.

Technology and communications
Young first received outside electric power in 1965. Today Young has telephone service both wired (MTE Communications) and wireless. In October 2008, a cellular communications tower was erected on Turner Hill (located in north Young). No cable television provider exists in Young, so satellite TV is typically used for television.  In 2008, a major fiber optics installation was performed throughout the town, providing high speed internet (DSL). Dial-up or satellite Internet is no longer typically used for Internet access, .

Services
There are a number of small businesses in Young. There are two full-service restaurants, the Antlers Cafe Pleasing Palate; one gas station, which sells gas and diesel fuel, Buddi Gas and Mini Mart, two convenience stores, an auto parts store, an auto mechanic, a motel, numerous cabins and cottages for rent, a thrift shop, a public library, a refuse service, the Valley Bar, and a weekly medical clinic. Young has an award-winning vineyard that has weekly wine tastings and serves gourmet dinners. Young also has a resident deputy and a volunteer fire department, and community center.

Education
Only one school exists in Young: Young Public School, serving grades K–12. The school has a low student to teacher ratio. The school was upgraded from a C to an A rating in 2013, the only A rating given to any school in Gila County at that time.

References

External links

 Young, AZ Visitor & Tourist Website – Young and Pleasant Valley Visitor's Website

Census-designated places in Gila County, Arizona